Clarke County is a county located in the U.S. state of Mississippi. As of the 2020 census, the population was 15,615. Its county seat is Quitman. Clarke County is named for Joshua G. Clarke, the first Mississippi state chancellor and judge.

The county is part of the Meridian, MS Micropolitan Statistical Area.

History
Before white men first arrived, the Choctaw Indians inhabited the land that would later be known as the Clarke County, Mississippi. Clarke County is only a portion of what was known as Okla Hannali or Six Town District of the Choctaws. Okla Hannali or Six Towns District existed at the time of the Dancing Rabbit Treaty in 1830.

David Gage, who came to the area in about 1820, was a Presbyterian minister. Traveling with him was Moses Jewel and Miss Skinner, who were both teachers. He settled at a place called Eewennans in the Choctaw Nation. David Gage, Moses Jewel, and Miss Skinner came to the territory for the purpose of educating the Indians some domestic habits.

At the beginning of 1832, settlers began to appear in what was known as the “New Purchase”. One of the first families to arrive was Jehu and Sarah Pagaus Evans, who arrived in February 1832, and settled east of Buckatunna Swamp.  By the fall of 1832, the “New Purchase” began to fill up quickly with arrivals. Among the early settlers were George Evans, Richard Wagster, Henry Hailes, Alex Hailes, Michael McCarty, James Bankston, Calvin M. Ludlow, John Williford, William Williford, James Risher, J. A. Fontain, John Gunn, Robert Fleming, John Fleming, Hiram Fleming, Norman Martin, Stephen Grice, Thomas F. Hicks, Alex McLendon, Roland B. Crosby, Cameron Grayson, Jesse C. Mott, David Neely, David B. Thompson, Dabney Edwards, Jacob Slack, John Johnston, Alex Trotter, Richard N. Hough, Robert McLaughlin, L. D. Phillips, Samuel Lee, Jesse Sumrall, Jeremiah Crane, Howell Sumrall, William Goleman, Thomas Goleman, Samuel K. Lewis and Thomas Watts. 

The county was founded in 1833. Quitman, named for General John A. Quitman.

After the organization of Clarke County, the first school was built close to the old Tennessee Trace.  Mr. Hennessy was the teacher and he came from Kinsale, Ireland. Religious services were held in the pioneer families’ home and on days of good weather, outside.  The first actual church built was Cedar Creek Church, a Methodist church, and Elim Baptist Church followed in the 1840s.

In the Spring of 1834, Joel Nail, a quadroon Indian, began moving the Choctaw Indians to Muskalresha, an old town in Neshoba County, Mississippi. These journeys continued through 1838 for all that would go. Some of the Choctaw Indians returned to their homes in Clarke County after arriving at Muskalresha.

In the 1830s there were no postal routes in Clarke County. However, there was a stagecoach line from Columbus, Mississippi to Winchester, Wayne County, Mississippi. The settlers of Clarke County would have to travel to Winchester, 25 miles away to receive their mail.

Ten black people were lynched in Clarke County, as documented in The Hanging Bridge by Jason Morgan Ward.

Geography
The Chickasawhay River flows north to south through the eastern portion of the county; it eventually meets the Pascagoula River.

Major highways
  Interstate 59
  U.S. Highway 11
  U.S. Highway 45
  Mississippi Highway 18

Adjacent counties
 Lauderdale County (north)
 Choctaw County, Alabama (east)
 Wayne County (south)
 Jasper County (west)

Demographics

2020 census

As of the 2020 United States Census, there were 15,615 people, 6,237 households, and 4,397 families residing in the county.

2000 census
As of the census of 2000, there were 17,955 people, 6,978 households, and 5,024 families residing in the county. The population density was 26 people per square mile (10/km2). There were 8,100 housing units at an average density of 12 per square mile (5/km2).  The racial makeup of the county was 64.49% White, 34.81% Black or African American, 0.11% Native American, 0.11% Asian, 0.01% Pacific Islander, 0.17% from other races, and 0.30% from two or more races.  0.67% of the population were Hispanic or Latino of any race.

There were 6,978 households, out of which 33.20% had children under the age of 18 living with them, 52.00% were married couples living together, 15.90% had a female householder with no husband present, and 28.00% were non-families. 25.50% of all households were made up of individuals, and 11.80% had someone living alone who was 65 years of age or older. The average household size was 2.55 and the average family size was 3.06.

In the county, the population was spread out, with 26.80% under the age of 18, 8.60% from 18 to 24, 26.70% from 25 to 44, 22.80% from 45 to 64, and 15.10% who were 65 years of age or older. The median age was 37 years. For every 100 females there were 91.30 males.  For every 100 females age 18 and over, there were 87.10 males.

The median income for a household in the county was $26,610, and the median income for a family was $33,396. Males had a median income of $27,580 versus $19,402 for females. The per capita income for the county was $14,288. About 18.80% of families and 23.00% of the population were below the poverty line, including 32.50% of those under age 18 and 24.10% of those age 65 or over.

Ancestry/Ethnicity
As of 2017 the largest self-identified ancestry groups/ethnic groups in Clarke County, Mississippi  were:

Communities

Cities
 Quitman (county seat)

Towns
 Enterprise
 Pachuta
 Shubuta
 Stonewall

Census-designated place
 De Soto

Unincorporated communities
 Basic
 Carmichael
 Energy
 Sykes
 Wautubbee

Ghost town
 Gin

Politics

See also
 National Register of Historic Places listings in Clarke County, Mississippi

References

 
Mississippi counties
County in Meridian micropolitan area
1833 establishments in Mississippi
Populated places established in 1833